Drei Mann auf einem Pferd is a 1957 West German film directed by Kurt Meisel.

Plot summary 
A man has discovered a fail-proof way of betting on the winning horse in any race. There is only one catch: He must never be the person to place the bet.

Differences from play

Cast 
Nadja Tiller as Kitty
Walter Giller as Erwin Tucke
Gardy Granass as Ulla, the wife
Theo Lingen as Mäcki
Kurt Meisel as Freddy
Walter Gross as Felix
Walter Müller as Clemens Holm
Harry Tagore as Harry
Carla Hagen as Fräulein Schnack, the Secretary
Willy Millowitsch as Direktor Körber
Friedl Hardt as Bardame

Soundtrack

See also 
Three Men on a Horse (1936)

External links 

1957 films
1957 comedy films
German comedy films
West German films
1950s German-language films
Films directed by Kurt Meisel
German films based on plays
German horse racing films
Remakes of American films
1950s German films